Applied spectroscopy is the application of various spectroscopic methods for the detection and identification of different elements or compounds to solve  problems in fields like forensics, medicine, the oil industry, atmospheric chemistry, and pharmacology.

Spectroscopic methods
A common spectroscopic method for analysis is Fourier transform infrared spectroscopy (FTIR), where chemical bonds can be detected through their characteristic infrared absorption frequencies or wavelengths. These absorption characteristics make infrared analyzers an invaluable tool in geoscience, environmental science, and atmospheric science. For instance, atmospheric gas monitoring has been facilitated by the development of commercially available gas analyzers which can distinguish between carbon dioxide, methane, carbon monoxide, oxygen, and nitric oxide.

Ultraviolet (UV) spectroscopy is used where strong absorption of UV radiation occurs in a substance. Such groups are known as chromophores and include aromatic groups, conjugated system of bonds, carbonyl groups and so on. Nuclear magnetic resonance spectroscopy detects hydrogen atoms in specific environments, and complements both infrared (IR) spectroscopy and UV spectroscopy. The use of Raman spectroscopy is growing for more specialist applications.

There are also derivative methods such as infrared microscopy, which allows very small areas to be analyzed in an optical microscope.

One method of elemental analysis that is important in forensic analysis is energy-dispersive X-ray spectroscopy (EDX) performed in the environmental scanning electron microscope (ESEM). The method involves analysis of back-scattered X-rays from the sample as a result of interaction with the electron beam. Automated EDX is further used in a range of automated mineralogy techniques for identification and textural mapping.

Sample preparation
In all three spectroscopic methods, the sample usually needs to be present in solution, which may present problems during forensic examination because it necessarily involves sampling solid from the object to be examined.

In FTIR, three types of samples can be analyzed: solution (KBr), powder, or film. A solid film is the easiest and most straight forward sample type to test.

Analysis of polymers
Many polymer degradation mechanisms can be followed using IR spectroscopy, such as UV degradation and oxidation, among many other failure modes.

UV degradation

Many polymers are attacked by UV radiation at vulnerable points in their chain structures. Thus, polypropylene suffers severe cracking in sunlight unless anti-oxidants are added. The point of attack occurs at the tertiary carbon atom present in every repeat unit, causing oxidation and finally chain breakage. Polyethylene is also susceptible to UV degradation, especially those variants that are branched polymers such as low-density polyethylene. The branch points are tertiary carbon atoms, so polymer degradation starts there and results in chain cleavage, and embrittlement. In the example shown at left, carbonyl groups were readily detected by IR spectroscopy from a cast thin film. The product was a road cone that had cracked in service, and many similar cones also failed because an anti-UV additive had not been used.

Oxidation

Polymers are susceptible to attack by atmospheric oxygen, especially at elevated temperatures encountered during processing to shape. Many process methods such as extrusion and injection moulding involve pumping molten polymer into tools, and the high temperatures needed for melting may result in oxidation unless precautions are taken. For example, a forearm crutch suddenly snapped and the user was severely injured in the resulting fall. The crutch had fractured across a polypropylene insert within the aluminium tube of the device, and IR spectroscopy of the material showed that it had oxidised, possibly as a result of poor moulding.

Oxidation is usually relatively easy to detect, owing to the strong absorption by the carbonyl group in the spectrum of polyolefins. Polypropylene has a relatively simple spectrum, with few peaks at the carbonyl position (like polyethylene). Oxidation tends to start at tertiary carbon atoms because free radicals here are more stable, so last longer and are attacked by oxygen. The carbonyl group can be further oxidised to break the chain, so weakening the material by lowering the molecular weight, and cracks start to grow in the regions affected.

Ozonolysis

The reaction occurring between double bonds and ozone is known as ozonolysis when one molecule of the gas reacts with the double bond:

The immediate result is formation of an ozonide, which then decomposes rapidly so that the double bond is cleaved. This is the critical step in chain breakage when polymers are attacked. The strength of polymers depends on the chain molecular weight or degree of polymerization: The higher the chain length the greater the mechanical strength (such as tensile strength). By cleaving the chain, the molecular weight drops rapidly and there comes a point when it has little strength whatsoever, and a crack forms. Further attack occurs in the freshly exposed crack surfaces and the crack grows steadily until it completes a circuit and the product separates or fails. In the case of a seal or a tube, failure occurs when the wall of the device is penetrated.

The carbonyl end groups that are formed are usually aldehydes or ketones, which can oxidise further to carboxylic acids. The net result is a high concentration of elemental oxygen on the crack surfaces, which can be detected using EDX in the ESEM. For example, two EDX spectra were obtained during an investigation into ozone cracking of diaphragm seals in a semiconductor fabrication factory. The EDX spectrum of the crack surface shows the high-oxygen peak compared with a constant sulfur peak. In contrast, the EDX spectrum of the unaffected elastomer surface spectrum shows a relatively low-oxygen peak compared with the sulfur peak.

See also

References
Forensic Materials Engineering: Case Studies by Peter Rhys Lewis, Colin Gagg, Ken Reynolds, CRC Press (2004).
Peter R Lewis and Sarah Hainsworth, Fuel Line Failure from stress corrosion cracking, Engineering Failure Analysis,13 (2006) 946-962.
J. Workman and Art Springsteen (Eds.), Applied Spectroscopy: A Compact Reference for Practitioners, Academic Press (1998) .

Polymer chemistry
Spectroscopy
Analytical chemistry